Jérôme Noetinger (born 1966 in Marseille) is an improviser and composer of electroacoustic music based in Rives, Isère, France.

He also runs the record label and record distributor Metamkine and writes in the French magazine Revue et corrigée. He features on the album Secret Curve by Ron Anderson's PAK on John Zorn's Tzadik label.

References

External links
http://www.metamkine.com/ Metamkine, the record label and CD mailorder company *Note: Redirects to https://www.corticalart.com/
http://metamkine.free.fr/ Metamkine, the experimental film and music collective

Free improvisation
Electroacoustic improvisation
Living people
French experimental musicians
1966 births